The 2013–14 Howard Bison men's basketball team represented Howard University during the 2013–14 NCAA Division I men's basketball season. The Bison, led by fourth year head coach Kevin Nickelberry, played their home games at the Burr Gymnasium and were members of the Mid-Eastern Athletic Conference. They finished the season 8–25, 5–11 in MEAC play to finish in a five way tie for eighth place. They advanced to the quarterfinals of the MEAC tournament where they lost to North Carolina Central.

Roster

Schedule

|-
!colspan=9 style="background:#FF0000; color:#00008B;"|Regular season

|-
!colspan=9 style="background:#FF0000; color:#00008B;"| 2014 MEAC tournament

References

Howard Bison men's basketball seasons
Howard
Howard Bison basketball
Howard Bison basketball